Paul Calvin Davis (born July 10, 1958) is a former American football linebacker who played three seasons in the National Football League with the Atlanta Falcons, New York Giants and St. Louis Cardinals. He played college football at the University of North Carolina at Chapel Hill and attended Appalachia High School in Appalachia, Virginia.

References

External links
Just Sports Stats

Living people
1958 births
Players of American football from Virginia
American football linebackers
North Carolina Tar Heels football players
Atlanta Falcons players
St. Louis Cardinals (football) players
New York Giants players
People from Appalachia, Virginia